Eensaar is an Estonian surname. Notable people with the surname include:
 Rain Eensaar (born 1974), Estonian orienteer, rogainer and adventure racer
 Silver Eensaar (born 1978), Estonian orienteer, rogainer and adventure racer

References

Estonian-language surnames